Benis is a rural village in Guney-ye Sharqi Rural District, in the Central District of Shabestar County, East Azerbaijan Province, Iran.

Structure and history
The layout of Benis is centralized; the village is surrounded by nearby mountains, which supply a stream that feeds into a local aqueduct. The aqueduct waters local gardens and greenery. There is a mosque, public bath, and various shops located around the village square. A main asphalt road leads south out of the village, into the rest of Shabestar County.

During the summer, the population of Benis increases significantly. Agriculture has been a local industry in Benis for many years, and continues to grow. In the 19th century, most migrations from the village were to foreign cities such as Istanbul, Baku and Tbilisi. After the Russian Revolution, more immigration took place from Benis across the country and into cities such as Abadan, Ahvaz and Tehran. Many workers are chiefly active in the businesses of confectionery production, and the processing of urea and paper.

As of the 2011 census, its population was 1,008, including 331 families; it was further recorded as 1,609 in 2016.

Notes

References 

Populated places in Shabestar County
Populated places in Iran